Holy Vale is a minor valley and small settlement within, on the island of St Mary's, the largest of the Isles of Scilly, England. Situated inland, nearby are Maypole and Longstone.

The name Holy Vale was originally La Val in 1301, it comes from the Norman French for low lying, at the foot.

The settlement of Holy Vale lies in the upper part of the valley, which leads down to the Higher Moors and Porth Hellick on the southeast coast of the island.

It was the scene of the murder of 18-year-old Stephen Menheniott by his father in 1976.

The only commercial vineyard on St Mary's is centred in Holy Vale, with the vines located in several small fields in the area.

References

External links

Hamlets in the Isles of Scilly
Populated places on St Mary's, Isles of Scilly